Eupetochira xystopala is a moth in the family Xyloryctidae. It was described by Edward Meyrick in 1908. It is found in Gauteng, South Africa.

The wingspan is 24–26 mm. The forewings are white with a narrow light brownish-ochreous stripe above the middle from the base to the apex. The hindwings are light grey, paler and tinged with whitish ochreous anteriorly.

References

Endemic moths of South Africa
Xyloryctidae
Moths described in 1908